Schinzinia is a fungal genus in the family Agaricaceae. It is a monotypic genus, containing the single species Schinzinia pustulosa . The genus and the species were circumscribed by Victor Fayod in Ann. Sci. Nat. Bot. ser.7, vol.9 on page 365 in 1889.

The genus name of Schinzinia is in honour of Hans Schinz (1858–1941), who was a Swiss explorer and botanist and was a native of Zürich.

See also
 List of Agaricaceae genera
 List of Agaricales genera

References

Agaricaceae
Monotypic Agaricales genera